The 2019 Football Championship of Lviv Oblast was won by Yunist Verkhnia Bilka.

Teams

Promoted
 Sokil Borshchovychi – 1st place in the 2018 Lviv Oblast First League
 FC Halychyna Drohobych – 4th place in the 2018 Lviv Oblast First League

Merged/reorganized
 Sokil Borshchovychi before the season's start changed its name to "Lviv-Sokil" Borshchovychi and after the Round 18 it was replaced by the FC Lviv football academy.
 FC Rochyn Sosnivka that competed in the 2018–19 Ukrainian Football Amateur League merged with Enerhetyk Dobrotvir as Enerhetyk-Rochyn Dobrotvir.

Premier League table

Gold match

References

External links

Football
Lviv
Lviv